Hauerland (also called Kremnitz-Deutschprobener Sprachinsel) is the German name for a region presently located in central Slovakia once inhabited by Carpathian Germans. Arisen from medieval Ostsiedlung population movements, it belonged to three German language islands within a greater Slovakian-speaking area. The other two were situated in Bratislava (Pressburg) and the Spiš (Zips) region.

Geography
The area laid within the forested Western Carpathians mountain range around the towns of Kremnitz Kremnica (Kremnitz) in the south and Nitrianske Pravno (Deutschproben) in the north. The term Hauerland was coined by German folklorists in the 1930s referring to several German placenames in the region bearing the suffix -hau ("hew (off)", i.e. to clear woodland). Most Hauerland villages are laid out as Waldhufendorf ("forest village") in areas of forest clearing with the farms arranged in a series along a road or stream.

History
In the Middle Ages, the Kremnica Mountains were an important gold mining area within Upper Hungary and directly subordinate to the Hungarian monarch. Numerous villages, mostly spread out in the mountainous and hilly areas, were agricultural and developed a special kind of German subculture.

In 1328 King Charles I granted Kremnica town privileges, followed by the foundation of Kunešov (Kuneschhau) in 1342, Sklené (Glaserhau) in 1360, Kremnické Bane (Johannesberg) in 1361, Turček (Dolný Turček, Unter-Turz) in 1371, Horná Štubňa (Oberstuben) in 1390, Krahule (Blaufuß) in 1422, and Janova Lehota (Drexlerhau) in 1487. 

The largest Hauerland municipality was Handlová (Krickerhau), established in 1367 within the Bojnice (Weinitz) Castle estates, where in the 19th century, coal deposits were discovered. In the northern part, the town of Nitrianske Pravno was founded about 1337, followed by Malinová (Zeche) in 1339, Kľačno (Gaidel), Tužina (Schmiedshau) about 1350, Vrícko (Münnichwies) in 1488, and Chvojnica (Fundstollen) in 1614 .

Over the centuries, the German-speaking population diminished, decimated already in the Hussite Wars of the 1420s and 30s, in the 16th century Ottoman–Habsburg wars, and again by insurgent Hungarian troops under Stephen Bocskay in 1605/06, succeeded by the forces of Gabriel Bethlen and George I Rákóczi.

See also
 Turóc County
 Germans of Czechoslovakia
 Slovak Republic (1939–1945)

Traditional regions of Slovakia
Geography of Slovakia
Hungarian German communities